Bryan Paul Barberena (born May 3, 1989) is an American mixed martial artist currently fighting in the Welterweight division in the Ultimate Fighting Championship. A professional competitor since 2009, he has also competed for King of the Cage.

Background
Barberena was born in Montclair, California, but grew up in Rancho Cucamonga, where he moved with his parents at a young age. He later attended Prescott High School, after moving to Arizona during his sophomore year where he played football and was a standout as a linebacker. His father is originally from Cali, Colombia, and Barberena has stated he feels both American and Colombian. He brings each country's flags to his fights.

Mixed martial arts career

Early career
Barberena begin his professional mixed martial arts career in late 2009 with an amateur record of 1–0. Over the next five years he trained primarily at the MMA Lab in Arizona and amassed a record of 9–2 for promotions such as Dakota Fighting Championships and King of the Cage; all but one of his wins came before the final bell.

Ultimate Fighting Championship
Barberena made his UFC debut in December 2014 when he faced Joe Ellenberger on December 13, 2014 at UFC on Fox 13.  He won the fight via TKO in the third round.

In his second fight for the promotion, Barberena faced Chad Laprise at UFC 186.  He lost the fight via unanimous decision.  Both participants were awarded Fight of the Night honors.

In his third fight for the promotion, Barberena filled in as a short notice replacement for Andrew Holbrook against Sage Northcutt at UFC on Fox: Johnson vs. Bader. With the late change, the matchup was contested at welterweight. Despite being a heavy underdog, Barberena won the bout via choke in the second round.

In his fourth fight for the promotion, Barberena faced Warlley Alves at UFC 198. Once again a substantial underdog, Barberena won the fight by unanimous decision after withstanding the initial storm.

Barberena next faced Colby Covington on December 17, 2016 at UFC on Fox 22. He lost the fight by unanimous decision.

Barberena next faced Joe Proctor on April 23, 2017 at UFC Fight Night: Swanson vs. Lobov. He won the fight via TKO in the first round.

Barberena faced Leon Edwards on September 2, 2017 at UFC Fight Night 115. He lost the fight by unanimous decision.

Barberena was expected to face Jake Ellenberger on June 1, 2018 at UFC Fight Night 131.  However, on March 23, 2018, Barberena pulled out due to injury. The pairing was rescheduled and took place on August 25, 2018 at UFC Fight Night 135. He won the fight via technical knockout in the first round.

After having split his training at MMA Lab and Gym-O before Ellenberger fight, Barberena decided to move his camp entirely to Gym-O in Gastonia, North Carolina in order to be closer to his residence near Knoxville, Tennessee. Barberena faced Vicente Luque on February 17, 2019 at UFC on ESPN 1. After a back-and-forth two rounds, he lost the fight via TKO late in the third round. This fight earned him the Fight of the Night award.

Barberena faced Randy Brown on June 22, 2019 at UFC Fight Night 154. He lost the fight via TKO in the third round.

Barberena faced Anthony Ivy on September 12, 2020 at UFC Fight Night 177. He won the fight via unanimous decision.

Barberena was expected to face Daniel Rodriguez on November 14, 2020 at UFC Fight Night: Felder vs. dos Anjos. However, Barberena underwent an emergency laparotomy a week before the event due to "internal bleeding from a couple ruptured arteries in his omentum" and was sidelined indefinitely.

Barberena faced Jason Witt on July 31, 2021 at UFC on ESPN 28. He lost the fight via majority decision. This fight earned him the Fight of the Night award.

Barberena was scheduled to face Matt Brown on December 4, 2021 at UFC on ESPN 31. However, Brown forced out of the bout due to testing positive for Covid-19, and he was replaced by Darian Weeks. Barberena won the fight via unanimous decision. 

The bout against Brown was rescheduled and eventually took place on March 26, 2022 at UFC on ESPN 33. Barberena won the back-and-forth bout via split decision. The fight was awarded the Fight of the Night award.

Barberena faced Robbie Lawler on July 2, 2022, at UFC 276. He won the back-and-forth bout by TKO in the second round. This fight earned him a Fight of the Night award.

Barberena faced Rafael dos Anjos on December 3, 2022 at  UFC on ESPN 42. He lost via neck crank in the second round.

Barbarena, as a replacement for Daniel Rodriguez, faced Gunnar Nelson on March 18, 2023, at UFC 286. He lost the fight via an armbar submission in the first round.

Personal life
Barberena and his wife Diana have three children.

Championships and awards
 Ultimate Fighting Championship
 Fight of the Night (Five times) 
 MMAJunkie.com
 2019 February Fight of the Month vs. Vicente Luque

Mixed martial arts record

|-
|Loss
|align=center|18–10
|Gunnar Nelson
|Submission (armbar)
|UFC 286
|
|align=center|1
|align=center|4:51
|London, England
|
|-
|Loss
|align=center|18–9
|Rafael dos Anjos
|Submission (neck crank)
|UFC on ESPN: Thompson vs. Holland
|
|align=center|2
|align=center|3:20
|Orlando, Florida, United States
|
|-
|Win
|align=center|18–8
|Robbie Lawler
|TKO (punches)
|UFC 276
| 
|align=center|2
|align=center|4:47
|Las Vegas, Nevada, United States
|
|-
|Win
|align=center|17–8
|Matt Brown
|Decision (split)
|UFC on ESPN: Blaydes vs. Daukaus
|
|align=center|3
|align=center|5:00
|Columbus, Ohio, United States
|
|-
|Win
|align=center|16–8
|Darian Weeks
|Decision (unanimous)
|UFC on ESPN: Font vs. Aldo
|
|align=center|3
|align=center|5:00
|Las Vegas, Nevada, United States
|
|-
|Loss
|align=center|15–8
|Jason Witt
|Decision (majority)
|UFC on ESPN: Hall vs. Strickland 
|
|align=center|3
|align=center|5:00
|Las Vegas, Nevada, United States
|
|-
|Win
|align=center|15–7
|Anthony Ivy
|Decision (unanimous)
|UFC Fight Night: Waterson vs. Hill
|
|align=center|3
|align=center|5:00
|Las Vegas, Nevada, United States
|
|-
|Loss
|align=center|14–7
|Randy Brown
|TKO (punches)
|UFC Fight Night: Moicano vs. The Korean Zombie 
|
|align=center|3
|align=center|2:54
|Greenville, South Carolina, United States
|
|-
|Loss
|align=center|14–6
|Vicente Luque
|TKO (knees and punches)
|UFC on ESPN: Ngannou vs. Velasquez 
|
|align=center|3
|align=center|4:54
|Phoenix, Arizona, United States
| 
|-
|Win
|align=center|14–5
|Jake Ellenberger
|TKO (punches)
|UFC Fight Night: Gaethje vs. Vick 
|
|align=center|1
|align=center|2:26
|Lincoln, Nebraska, United States
|
|-
|Loss
|align=center|13–5
|Leon Edwards
|Decision (unanimous)
|UFC Fight Night: Volkov vs. Struve 
|
|align=center|3
|align=center|5:00
|Rotterdam, Netherlands
|
|-
|Win
|align=center|13–4
|Joe Proctor
|TKO (knees and punches)
|UFC Fight Night: Swanson vs. Lobov
|
|align=center|1
|align=center|3:30
|Nashville, Tennessee, United States
|
|-
|Loss
|align=center|12–4
|Colby Covington
|Decision (unanimous)
|UFC on Fox: VanZant vs. Waterson
|
|align=center|3
|align=center|5:00
|Sacramento, California, United States
|
|-
|Win
|align=center|12–3
|Warlley Alves
|Decision (unanimous)
|UFC 198
|
|align=center|3
|align=center|5:00
|Curitiba, Brazil
|
|-
| Win
| align=center|11–3
| Sage Northcutt
| Submission (arm-triangle choke)
| UFC on Fox: Johnson vs. Bader
| 
| align=center|2
| align=center|3:06
| Newark, New Jersey, United States
|
|-
| Loss
| align=center|10–3
| Chad Laprise
| Decision (unanimous)
| UFC 186
| 
| align=center|3
| align=center|5:00
| Montreal, Quebec, Canada
| 
|-
| Win
| align=center|10–2
| Joe Ellenberger
| TKO (punches)
| UFC on Fox: dos Santos vs. Miocic
| 
| align=center|3
| align=center|3:24
| Phoenix, Arizona, United States
|
|-
| Win
| align=center|9–2
| Eric Moon
| TKO (punches)
| KOTC: Radar Lock
| 
| align=center|1
| align=center|4:07
| Scottsdale, Arizona, United States
|
|-
| Win
| align=center|8–2
| Damien Hill
| Submission (rear-naked choke)
| Dakota FC 17: Winter Brawl 2014
| 
| align=center|3
| align=center|2:17
| Fargo, North Dakota, United States
|
|-
| Win
| align=center|7–2
| Marcos Marquez
| TKO (punches)
| Dakota FC 16: Fall Brawl 2013
| 
| align=center|3
| align=center|3:43
| Fargo, North Dakota, United States
|
|-
| Win
| align=center|6–2
| Dane Sayers
| Decision (unanimous)
| Dakota FC 13: Coming Home
| 
| align=center|5
| align=center|5:00
| Grand Forks, North Dakota, United States
|
|-
| Win
| align=center|5–2
| Vernon Harrison
| TKO (punches)
| Crowbar MMA: Rumble at the Fair
| 
| align=center|2
| align=center|4:00
| Grand Forks, North Dakota, United States
|
|-
|Win
| align=center|4–2
| Garrett Olson
| TKO (punches)
| KOTC: Mainstream
| 
| align=center|2
| align=center|4:24
| Morton, Minnesota, United States
|
|-
| Loss
| align=center|3–2
| Tyler Klejeski
| Decision (unanimous)
| Cage Fighting Xtreme
| 
| align=center|3
| align=center|5:00
| Red Lake, Minnesota, United States
|
|-
| Win
| align=center|3–1
| David Barnett
| KO (punches)
| KOTC: Uppercut
| 
| align=center| 1
| align=center| 2:25
| Laughlin, Nevada United States
|
|-
| Loss
| align=center|2–1
| Derek Smith
| Submission (armbar)
| KOTC: Offensive Strategy
| 
| align=center| 3
| align=center| 2:55
| Walker, Minnesota, United States
| 
|-
| Win
| align=center|2–0
| Dave Alvarez
| TKO (punches)
| The Cage Inc.: Battle at the Border 3
| 
| align=center| 2
| align=center| 1:41
| Hankinson, North Dakota, United States
|
|-
| Win
| align=center|1–0
| Dirk Thiedeman
| KO (punches)
| Dakota FC 12
| 
| align=center| 1
| align=center| 2:20
| Fargo, North Dakota, United States
|

Amateur mixed martial arts record

| Win
| align=center|1–0
| Brandon Rossbach
| Decision (unanimous)
| KOTC: Turmoil
| 
| align=center| 3
| align=center| 3:00
| Walker, Minnesota, United States
|

See also
 List of current UFC fighters
 List of male mixed martial artists

References

External links
 
 

1989 births
Living people
American male mixed martial artists
Welterweight mixed martial artists
Mixed martial artists utilizing Brazilian jiu-jitsu
American practitioners of Brazilian jiu-jitsu
American sportspeople of Colombian descent
People from Montclair, California
Sportspeople from San Bernardino County, California
Sportspeople from Glendale, Arizona
Ultimate Fighting Championship male fighters